The airship LZ 37 was a World War I Zeppelin of the German Kaiserliche Marine (Imperial Navy). It was the first Zeppelin to be brought down during the war by an enemy plane, on the night of 6 to 7 June 1915.

History
In 1915 Zeppelins were first used by Germany for strategic bombing of the United Kingdom and France.

LZ 37 was part of a raid with Zeppelins LZ 38 and LZ 39. While returning, she was intercepted in the air by Reginald Warneford in his Morane Parasol during its first raid on Calais, on 7 June 1915. Warneford dropped six  Hales bombs on the zeppelin, which caught fire and crashed into the convent school of Sint-Amandsberg, next to Ghent, Belgium, killing two nuns. The commander of LZ 37, Oberleutnant , and seven members of the crew were killed. One crew member, Steuermann Alfred Mühler,  survived with only superficial burns and bruises when he was precipitated from the forward gondola, landing in a bed. It was the first victory of a heavier-than-air aircraft over a lighter-than-air dirigible. Warneford was awarded the Victoria Cross for his achievement.

Specifications

Citations

References

External links

 

Zeppelins
Belgium in World War I
Hydrogen airships
Military airships of World War I
Airships of the Imperial German Navy
1915 in Germany
Aircraft first flown in 1915